Chrysopelea, more commonly known as the flying snake or gliding snake  is a genus that belongs to the family Colubridae. Flying snakes are mildly venomous, though the venom is dangerous only to their small prey. Their range is in Southeast Asia (the mainland (Vietnam, Cambodia, Myanmar, and Laos), Indonesia, and the Philippines), southernmost China, India, and Sri Lanka.

Gliding
Chrysopelea is also known by its common name "flying snake". It climbs using ridge scales along its belly, pushing against the rough bark of tree trunks, allowing it to move vertically up a tree. Upon reaching the end of a branch, the snake continues moving until its tail dangles from the end of the branch. It then makes a J-shape bend, leans forward to select the level of inclination it wishes to use to control its glide path, as well as selecting a desired landing area. Once it decides on a destination, it propels itself by thrusting its body up and away from the tree, sucking in its abdomen and flaring out its ribs to turn its body into a "pseudo concave wing", all the while making a continual serpentine motion of lateral undulation parallel to the ground to stabilise its direction in midair in order to land safely.

The combination of forming a C-shape, flattening its abdomen and making a motion of lateral undulation in the air makes it possible for the snake to glide in the air, where it also manages to save energy compared to travel on the ground and dodge earth-bound predators. The concave wing that the snake creates in flattening itself nearly doubles the width of its body from the back of the head to the anal vent, which is close to the end of the snake's tail, causing the cross section of the snake's body to resemble the cross section of a frisbee or flying disc. When a flying disc spins in the air, the designed cross sectional concavity causes increased air pressure under the centre of the disc, causing lift for the disc to fly, and the snake continuously moves in lateral undulation to create the same effect of increased air pressure underneath its arched body to glide.

Flying snakes are able to glide better than flying squirrels and other gliding animals, despite the lack of limbs, wings, or any other wing-like projections, gliding as far as 100 meters through the forests and jungles they inhabit. Their destination is mostly predicted by ballistics; however, they can exercise some in-flight attitude control by "slithering" in the air.

Their ability to glide has been an object of interest for physicists and the United States Department of Defense in recent years, and studies continue to be made on what other, more subtle, factors contribute to their gliding. According to recent research conducted by the University of Chicago, scientists discovered a negative correlation between size and gliding ability, in which smaller flying snakes were able to glide longer distances horizontally.

According to research performed by Professor Jake Socha at Virginia Tech, these snakes can change the shape of their body in order to produce aerodynamic forces so they can glide in the air. Scientists are hopeful that this research will lead to the design of robots that can glide in the air from one place to another.

Venom
The genus is considered mildly venomous, with a few confirmed cases of medically significant envenomation. Chrysopelea species are not included in lists of snakes considered venomous to people.

Diet
Chrysopelea are diurnal, which means they hunt during the day. Their diets are variable depending on their range, but they are known to eat lizards, rodents, frogs, birds, and bats. They are mildly venomous snakes, but their tiny, fixed rear fangs make them dangerous only to their small prey.

Species
There are five recognized species of flying snake, found from western India to the Indonesian archipelago. Knowledge of their behavior in the wild is limited, but they are thought to be highly arboreal, rarely descending from the canopy.

References

External links

Researchers reveal secrets of snake flight
Flying tree snake info, fact sheet, photos

Colubrids
Snakes of Asia
Reptiles of India
Gliding snakes
Snake genera
Taxa named by Heinrich Boie